La Yifan (born 1967) is a Chinese diplomat wo served as Chinese Ambassador to Ethiopia between 2015 and 2017.

Biography
Born in 1967, La graduated from the China Foreign Affairs University. After university, he was assigned to the Ministry of Foreign Affairs. He served as the deputy director of the Department of Foreign Affairs Management, Ministry of Foreign Affairs before he took office of the Chinese Ambassador to Ethiopia in February 2015.  In addition, he was dispatched to work in the Chinese Representative Office in the United Nations Economic and Social Commission for Asia and the Pacific and on the Permanent Mission to the United Nations Office in Geneva. In September 2017, he was appointed director of the International Cooperation Bureau, Central Commission for Discipline Inspection, replacing Liu Jianchao.

References

 

1967 births
Living people
Ambassadors of China to Ethiopia
China Foreign Affairs University alumni